The Knobeloch–Seibert Farm is a historic farm located on the east side of Schneider Road east of Belleville, Illinois. The farm was established circa 1832 by John W. Knobeloch and his family; after passing through several generations of the Knobeloch family, it was inherited by Henry Seibert. Both the Knobeloch and Seibert families immigrated to the area from Germany as part of a wave of German immigration to Illinois' American Bottom region in the early 1800s. The first building on the farm was a farmhouse built in 1832, which no longer stands; the oldest surviving building on the farm is the 1844 barn. The second farmhouse, constructed in 1861, features a segmented arched brick cellar, a characteristic feature of German vernacular architecture.

The farm was added to the National Register of Historic Places on May 9, 1983.

References

Knobeloch-Seibert Farm
National Register of Historic Places in St. Clair County, Illinois
Farms on the National Register of Historic Places in Illinois
1832 establishments in Illinois